Mes-Meheux, Sierra Leone is a private island of the Banana Islands and was named after Jean Meheux, who was a French merchant and trader who assimilated into African society. Jean Meheux had several children with a Temne woman including John Meheux, a Sheriff of the Colony of Sierra Leone. Jean Meheux owned a large house and extensive property in Kissy Road and Kissy Street and 'Meheux Street' commemorates Jean Meheux's family and descendants.

Conservation and Tourism
Mes-Meheux is known for its untouched virgin forest and wildlife, it operates throughout the year as an 'Eco adventure tourism' island, with animal and plant conservation attracting visitors from all over the world.

External links
Mes-Meheux Adventure Tourism

Islands of Sierra Leone
Geography of Freetown
History of Sierra Leone
Private islands of Africa